Dato Maharaja Lela or Lela Pandak Lam (died on 20 January 1877) was a Malay chief from Perak. He was a leader who later led the struggle against the British in Perak. Together with other leaders such as Dato 'Sagor, he planned an alliance to assassinate James W. W. Birch, the British Resident of Perak. His decision was approved in a meeting at Durian Sebatang, chaired by Sultan Abdullah on 21 July 1875.

Early life 
A descendant of Daeng Salili, Pandak Lam was the son of a Bugis king from Luwuk District, Sulawesi. During the reign of Sultan Muzaffar Shah III, he came to Perak and was appointed Mufti and awarded the title "Dato Maharaja Lela," granting him the authority to punish by decapitation without question.

Assassination of Birch 
Dato Maharaja Lela and his assistant Sepuntum speared Resident Birch to death on 2 November 1875, as Birch was taking his bath by a river near Pasir Salak, which is located somewhere around today's Teluk Intan (Teluk Anson).  

The murder of J. W. W. Birch led the British army to attack Pasir Salak, and following several days of battle, the leaders of the rebellion surrendered. In a subsequent trial held between 14 and 22 December in Matang, Sultan Abdullah and Ngah Ibrahim was deposed and sent to exile in Seychelles. Dato Maharaja Lela meanwhile was found guilty for the murder of Birch and sentenced to death. He was executed by hanging on 20 January 1877 in Taiping. In the wake of the incident, the British administration was shifted to Taiping.

There is debate over the reason for Birch's assassination. One view is that he was assassinated because he outlawed slavery in Perak. Dato Maharaja Lela, whose income depended on capturing and selling the natives of Perak or Orang Asli as slaves, was then incensed and plotted with some of the slave-traders to kill Birch by spearing him when he was taking his bath in the river.

The more popular view among right-wing Malay historians is that Birch was assassinated because of his disrespect for the local customs and traditions, which raised tensions with local Malay chiefs. He is generally celebrated as a folk hero by Malay nationalists, and seen as a symbol of the Malay resistance against British colonialism and the first stirrings of early nationalism.

The terms Dato Maharaja Lela (in Malay language), and merajalela (in Indonesian language), to describe tyrannical rule, stem from his name.

See also
 Rentap
 Sharif Masahor
 Rosli Dhobi, a famous Malay Sarawakian who killed Sir Duncan Stewart

References

External links
 Laman web Perpustakaan Negara Malaysia
 Pejabat DYMM Sultan Perak Darul Ridzuan
 Adopted from Sejarah Tingkatan 2 & Sejarah Tingkatan 5 text book.

Malaysian people of Malay descent
Malaysian rebels
History of Perak
Year of birth missing
1877 deaths
People from Perak
Malaysian assassins
Executed Malaysian people
Malaysian people convicted of murder
People executed for murder
People executed by British Malaya by hanging
Assassins of heads of government
People from British Malaya
1870s in British Malaya
Executed assassins